Georgi Argilashki (born 13 June 1991) is a Bulgarian footballer who plays as a goalkeeper for Botev Plovdiv.

Career

Ludogorets Razgrad
In December 2011, Argilashki signed a long-term contract with Ludogorets Razgrad. He made his A Group debut in a 1–1 home draw against Beroe Stara Zagora on 31 May 2015. He mainly served as an understudy to Vladislav Stoyanov and Milan Borjan during the 2015/2016 season.

In the summer of 2016 he was sent on loan to Pirin Blagoevgrad until end of the season. However, on 1 March 2017 his loan was ended and he was sent again on loan in Vereya until rest of the season. On 20 June 2017, his contract with Ludogorets Razgrad was terminated by mutual consent.

Statistics

Club

References

External links
 

1991 births
Living people
Footballers from Plovdiv
Bulgarian footballers
PFC Ludogorets Razgrad II players
PFC Ludogorets Razgrad players
FC Pirin Razlog players
OFC Pirin Blagoevgrad players
FC Vereya players
PFC Beroe Stara Zagora players
Botev Plovdiv players
First Professional Football League (Bulgaria) players
Second Professional Football League (Bulgaria) players
Association football goalkeepers